The 1974 Vanderbilt Commodores football team represented Vanderbilt University in the 1974 NCAA Division I football season.  The Commodores scored 313 points while allowing 199 points.  Led by head coach Steve Sloan, the Commodores had their best record since 1955 and appeared in the school's second bowl game.  Vanderbilt did not return to a bowl game until 1982.

Season
Vanderbilt defeated Florida, Ole Miss, Tulane, Louisville, Army, and the Virginia Military Institute.  Vanderbilt lost to Kentucky, Georgia, and Alabama.  Vanderbilt's final two games ended in ties: the regular season finale against rival Tennessee and the 1974 Peach Bowl against Texas Tech.  Vanderbilt's final record was 7–3–2 (2–3–1 in the SEC).  After the season, head coach Steve Sloan left Vanderbilt to become head coach at Texas Tech, the team Vanderbilt had faced in the Peach Bowl to close the season.

Schedule

Team players drafted into the NFL

References

Vanderbilt
Vanderbilt Commodores football seasons
Vanderbilt Commodores football